Prince Street Synagogue (Oheb Shalom), in the Springfield/Belmont neighborhood, is the  oldest synagogue building still standing in Newark, Essex County, New Jersey, United States.

Documentation records note Prince Street in Newark, New Jersey as a being one of the earliest, relatively clandestine places of Jewish settlement and worship (primarily Sephardic Jews of Spanish, Portuguese, or Italian descent) in the colonial and early American eras.

The later arriving Ashkenazi Jews of Newark, New Jersey accommodated to the areas in and around Prince Street, named for one of the original anglicized Sephardic family names.

History
The modest, Moorish Revival building at 32 Prince Street was built in 1884 for Oheb Shalom Congregation, a congregation of Bohemian Jews.  The congregation has since moved to South Orange.   The building served as the home of the Metropolitan Baptist Church from 1940 to 1993.  In 1990 it was slated for destruction as part of land clearance to enable the construction of Newark's Society Hill housing development.  Historic preservationist Mark W. Gordon led a movement to  preserve the historic building.

It has been restored  by Greater Newark Conservancy and is now used as an environmental center.  It was listed on the New Jersey Register of Historic Places on January 16, 1990.
The brick, Moorish Revival synagogue features  windows with Horseshoe arches, an entrance arch with red and white Voussoirs, and twin  towers topped by modest domes.

See also
List of the oldest buildings in New Jersey
Jewish Museum of New Jersey at Ahavas Sholom
Congregation Adas Emuno (New Jersey)
Woodbine Brotherhood Synagogue

References

External links
Synagogue images

Ashkenazi Jewish culture in New Jersey
Czech-Jewish culture in the United States
Synagogues completed in 1884
Jews and Judaism in Newark, New Jersey
Moorish Revival synagogues
Buildings and structures in Newark, New Jersey
Religious buildings and structures in Essex County, New Jersey
Synagogues in New Jersey
Moorish Revival architecture in New Jersey
Culture of Newark, New Jersey
New Jersey Register of Historic Places